Chirag United may refer to:
 Chirag United Club Kerala, formed as VIVA Kerala in 2004, adopted current name in 2011
 Prayag United S.C. - known as Chirag United from 2007 to 2011